40th Tactical Squadron (known as 40.ELT - 40 Eskadra Lotnictwa Taktycznego in Poland) is a fighter squadron of Polish Air Force established in 2000. Squadron is stationed in 21st Air Base and operates 18 Sukhoi Su-22 ground attack aircraft.

References

Squadrons of the Polish Air Force